The 32nd King's Cup were held from 10–17 February 2001 at Bangkok, Thailand. The King's Cup (คิงส์คัพ) is an annual football tournament; the first tournament was played in 1968.

Sweden won the tournament beating China 3–0 in the final.

Venue
All matches held at the National Stadium in Bangkok, Thailand

Tournament

Matches

Place Match

Final

Winner

References
 2001 King's Cup results RSSSF

King's Cup
International association football competitions hosted by Thailand
Cup